Metsantan Pass, is a mountain pass in the Metsantan Range of the Omineca Mountains in the Northern Interior of British Columbia, Canada.  It is located between Metsantan Lake, in the drainage basin of the Stikine River (NW) and the headwaters of the Toodoggone River (SE), a tributary of the Finlay River which is part of the Peace-Mackenzie River drainage area, and therefore is located along the Continental Divide.

See also 
Metsantan Peak

References 

Mountain passes of British Columbia
Omineca Mountains
Northern Interior of British Columbia
Great Divide of North America